Rubble Glacier is an ice-filled valley in the Palmer Land region of the Antarctic Peninsula. It is surrounded by Giza Peak and the ridge connecting it to Baily Ridge to the north and Elephant Ridge to the south. Rubble Glacier is referred to as "Man-Pack Glacier" in scientific reports of the early 1960s, but is now descriptively referred to as Rubble Glacier or sometimes as "Louis Glacier".

References 

Glaciers of Palmer Land